Independent Kidderminster Hospital and Health Concern, (often known as Independent Community And Health Concern and abbreviated as ICHC) is a political party based in Kidderminster, United Kingdom. The party was founded in 2000, having grown out of the campaign to restore the casualty unit at Kidderminster Hospital. Since 2015 it has successfully contested local elections within the Wyre Forest local government area, which includes Kidderminster.

History

Richard Taylor

The party had one MP in the House of Commons, Richard Taylor, who won a surprise landslide victory in the 2001 general election standing for the Wyre Forest constituency, which includes Kidderminster. He was the only person not from a major party elected as an MP from an English constituency in the 2001 Parliament. Health Concern benefited from a decision by the Liberal Democrats not to put up a candidate of their own.

Taylor was re-elected as member for Wyre Forest in the 2005 election, albeit with a considerably reduced majority. The party lost its only seat in the 2010 election to the Conservative candidate, Mark Garnier, by a margin of 2,643 votes.

Taylor was awarded an MBE in the Queen's Birthday Honours List in 2014, for services to Worcestershire, particularly Kidderminster Hospital.

Local government
ICHC is also active in local government. It is currently the major party in the Progressive Alliance coalition which is currently in control of Wyre Forest District Council after getting 8 seats in the 2019 election. Before the 2004 local elections it held 16 seats on Wyre Forest District Council, making it the largest party, but in those elections it lost half of these seats to the Conservative Party. The 2005 local elections to Worcestershire County Council, held on the same day as the general election, also saw Health Concern perform poorly, losing five of its six seats. However, in the 2006 local elections for the district council, it held its own, making one net gain to take its representation from eight to nine. In the 2007 local elections its representation again increased, from nine to 10 members. The party then gradually lost seats on Wyre Forest District Council, with just 7 seats after the 2014 elections.

After the May 2014 local elections, Health Concern lost two district seats, reducing the overall number to seven, but managed to gain control of Bewdley Town Council, taking seven of the 13 available seats, a gain of three.

The party previously stood candidates for Shropshire Council, and had won seats, however it did not stand any candidates in the 2021 election.

Organisation
According to the Electoral Commission's register of parties, its leader is Taylor, Peter Young is the nominating officer, Keith Robertson is treasurer, and Gerald Wheeler is campaigns officer. The party does have a formal membership. It had expenditure of about £12,000 and income of about £9,000 in the 2005 calendar year.

References

External links
 Official website

Political parties established in 2000
Locally based political parties in England
Organisations based in Worcestershire
Politics of Worcestershire
Politics of Shropshire
Kidderminster
2000 establishments in England
Single-issue political parties in United Kingdom